The Jack Hills are a range of hills in Mid West Western Australia. They are best known as the source of the oldest material of terrestrial origin found to date: Hadean zircons that formed around 4.39 billion years ago. These zircons have enabled deeper research into the conditions on Earth in the Hadean eon. In 2015, "remains of biotic life" were found in 4.1 billion-year-old rocks there. According to one of the researchers, "If life arose relatively quickly on Earth...then it could be common in the universe."

Geography

Geology

Sedimentary siliciclastic rocks, interpreted as alluvial fan-delta deposits, are the major lithology. Minor mafic/ultramafic rocks and banded iron formation (BIF) are also found in the sequence. The overall sequence is generally considered to be a granulite gneiss, which has undergone multiple deformations and multiple metamorphic episodes. The protolith age of the Narryer Gneiss Terrane is variable, but generally considered to be in excess of 3.6 Ga (billion years).

Oldest zircons on Earth 
 
Detrital zircons with ages greater than 4 billion years old have been found in these rocks, and a 4,404 ± 8 million year old zircon was found at Erawandoo Hill; this is the oldest dated material originating on Earth; the date is in the Cryptic era of the Hadean eon. They were found within a unit of the supracrustal sequence, a metamorphosed conglomerate considered to have an age ~3.0 Ga. Given the detrital nature of the rock unit, the zircons are sourced from pre-existing rocks which were then weathered and the resultant sediment deposited as sedimentary rock.

The zircons and various aspects of their geochemistry provide evidence for the existence of continental-type crust on the surface of Earth during the Hadean eon, contrasting with earlier ideas on the earliest phase of Earth's history. Additionally, oxygen isotopic ratios in the zircons provide evidence for the presence of liquid water on the surface, if not a water ocean; also contrasting with earlier ideas on Earth's history. The hypothesis of humid and cool conditions before the Late Heavy Bombardment has been promoted as cool early Earth.

Economic geology 
The Jack Hills banded iron formation (BIF) is the site of a non-operating minor iron ore mine owned by Mitsubishi Development Pty Ltd, a wholly owned subsidiary of Mitsubishi Corporation, which in the past exported up to 3 million tonnes per annum of high grade detrital hematite iron ore via the port of Geraldton.

Other companies operating in the area are also planning major magnetite BIF-based iron ore mines.

Conservation
Because of their importance as a geology research site, the Jack Hills were nominated to the Register of the National Estate in 2003. , they had an "Interim Listing", which means they have been formally proposed for inclusion in the Register. In July 2020 it was announced that the Erawondoo Hill site has been permanently included in the National Heritage List.

IUGS geological heritage site
In respect of being the 'largest in situ repository of the oldest terrestrial crystals known to exist on Earth', the International Union of Geological Sciences (IUGS) included the 'Archean zircons of Erawondoo Hill' in its assemblage of 100 'geological heritage sites' around the world in a listing published in October 2022. The organisation defines an IUGS Geological Heritage Site as 'a key place with geological elements and/or processes of international scientific relevance, used as a reference, and/or with a substantial contribution to the development of geological sciences through history.'

References

Mid West (Western Australia)
Hills of Australia
Geology of Western Australia
Precambrian Oceania
First 100 IUGS Geological Heritage Sites